Ian Hart (born 1964) is an English actor.

Ian Hart may also refer to:

Ian Hart (neurologist)  (1958–2008) British lecturer and consultant
Ian Hart, fictional character in The Last Train (TV series)

See also
Ian Harte, Irish footballer